Stathmin-3 is a protein that in humans is encoded by the STMN3 gene.

Function 

The protein encoded by this gene belongs to the stathmin/oncoprotein 18 family of microtubule-destabilizing phosphoproteins. It is similar to the SCG10 protein and is involved in signal transduction and regulation of microtubule dynamics.

Interactions 

STMN3 has been shown to interact with TRPC5.

References

Further reading